The following notable players have played for the Aruba national football team, either as a member of the starting eleven or as a substitute. Each player's details include his playing position while with the team, the number of caps earned (appearances) and goals scored in all international matches, and their debut and most recent match year. The names are initially ordered by number of caps (in descending order), then by alphabetical order.

Key

Players

References 

Aruba_international_footballers
Aruba international footballers
Association football player non-biographical articles